The Baco Islands are a chain of three small wooded islands in the Philippines, located off the northern coast of Mindoro island. The Baco Islands are located off the coast of Baco, Oriental Mindoro, in the Verde Island Passage and are administered as part of the city of Calapan. The island chain consists of:

 Baco Grande Island (also known as just Baco Island) – largest island in the southwest of the chain that is  feet in elevation
 Baco Medio Island - middle island that is  feet in elevation
 Baco Chico Island – smallest island in the northeast of the chain that is  feet in elevation

See also

 List of islands of the Philippines

References

Islands of Oriental Mindoro
Calapan